The London Labour Party mayoral selection of 2002 was the process by which the Labour Party selected its candidate for Mayor of London, to stand in the 2004 mayoral election. Nicky Gavron, Deputy Mayor of London and London Assembly member for Enfield and Haringey, was selected to stand.

In the event, Gavron did not contest the Mayoral election - in 2004 she stood aside as the Labour candidate and incumbent Mayor Ken Livingstone was nominated as the new candidate following his readmission to the Labour Party. Livingstone went on to win re-election, appointing Gavron his Deputy.

Selection process

The Labour Party candidate for Mayor was elected by an electoral college composed half-and-half of the votes of Labour members in London and the votes of affiliated organisations.

Candidates

Nicky Gavron, Deputy Mayor of London and London Assembly member for Enfield and Haringey.
Tony Banks, Minister for Sport 1997-1999; Member of Parliament for West Ham.
Bob Shannon, former Leader of Harrow Council.

Result

First round

Second round

Source: Unfortunately, this service is no longer available | University of Essex

See also

London Labour Party mayoral selection, 2004
2004 London mayoral election

References

External links
London Labour Party website

London Labour Party
Mayoral elections in London
2002 in London
2002 elections in the United Kingdom